Milan Randl(born 24 April 1987 in Bratislava, Slovakia) is a Slovak judoka. He competed at the 2012 Summer Olympics in the -90 kg event.

References

External links
 
 

1987 births
Living people
Slovak male judoka
Olympic judoka of Slovakia
Judoka at the 2012 Summer Olympics
Sportspeople from Bratislava
European Games competitors for Slovakia
Judoka at the 2015 European Games
Judoka at the 2019 European Games